Józef Beker (born 28 March 1937) is a former Polish cyclist. He competed in the team time trial at the 1964 Summer Olympics. He won the Tour de Pologne in 1965. He is born in Mokrzeszow, his profession is a lathe operator.

References

External links

1937 births
Living people
Polish male cyclists
Olympic cyclists of Poland
Cyclists at the 1964 Summer Olympics
People from Ternopil Oblast